The topic of Jewish participation in sports is discussed extensively in academic and popular literature. Scholars believe that sports have been a historical avenue for Jewish people to overcome obstacles toward their participation in secular society. Especially before the mid-20th century in Europe and the United States.

Boldface denotes a current competitor.

Commissioners

 Gary Bettman, US, National Hockey League Commissioner
 Mark Cohon, Canada, Canadian Football League Commissioner
 Jim Drucker, US, Continental Basketball Association Commissioner; and Arena Football League Commissioner
 Don Garber, US, Major League Soccer Commissioner
 Abe J Greene, US, National Boxing Association (now World Boxing Association) 
 Ludwig Guttmann, Germany, founder of the Paralympics
 Sydney Halter, Canada, first Commissioner of the Canadian Football League
 Cary Kaplan, Canada, President & General Manager, Brampton Beast hockey club; former Commissioner & Chairman of Canadian Soccer League
 Frank Lowy, Czechoslovak-born Australian-Israeli, chair of Football Federation Australia
 Maurice Podoloff, Ukraine-born US, first President of the National Basketball Association
 Jaap van Praag, Dutch, President of Ajax Amsterdam 1964–78, President of the Royal Dutch Football Association
 Alan Rothenberg, US, former President of the United States Soccer Federation; former executive and investor of the North American Soccer League. Currently Vice President of the North American governing body of association football (CONCACAF)
 Bud Selig, US, former Major League Baseball Commissioner, owner of Milwaukee Brewers
 Adam Silver, US, Commissioner of the National Basketball Association
 David Stern, US, former National Basketball Association Commissioner
 Grigory Surkis, Ukraine, Chairman of Football Federation of Ukraine

Managers and coaches

 Ray Arcel, US, boxing trainer; trained 18 world champions
 Red Auerbach, US, basketball guard, NBA coach (9 championships) & GM, Hall of Fame
 Brad Ausmus, US, baseball catcher, All-Star, 3x Gold Glove, former manager of the Detroit Tigers and Los Angeles Angels
 Big Bill Bachrach, US, swimming coach, International Swimming Hall of Fame
 Morris "Whitey" Bimstein, US, boxing trainer
 David Blatt, US, college & Israeli professional basketball guard, former NBA coach, Cleveland Cavaliers
 Chaim Bloom (born 1983), US, Chief Baseball Officer for the Boston Red Sox
 Larry Brown, US, basketball player & pro and college coach, currently at Southern Methodist University
 Mike Chernoff, General Manager of the Cleveland Indians of Major League Baseball
 Andy Cohen, US, Major League second baseman and coach; managed one game for the Philadelphia Phillies in 1960.
 Keith Dambrot, US, men's basketball coach (Duquesne University)
 Jon Daniels, US, President of Baseball Operations and General Manager of the Major League Baseball team the Texas Rangers
 Al Davis, US, football owner/coach of Oakland Raiders
 Nikolay Epshtein, Soviet ice hockey coach
 Charlotte "Eppie" Epstein, US, coach, International Swimming Hall of Fame
 Theo Epstein, US, former President of Baseball Operations (Chicago Cubs); former General Manager, Boston Red Sox
 Lawrence Frank, US, head coach (New Jersey Nets, 2004–10; Detroit Pistons, 2011–13)
 Andrew Friedman, US, President of Baseball Operations of the Los Angeles Dodgers (and previously general manager of the Tampa Bay Rays) of Major League Baseball
 Marty Friedman, US, basketball player & coach
 Sam Fuld, US, General Manager of the Philadelphia Phillies of Major League Baseball
 Eran Ganot, US, men's basketball head coach (University of Hawaii)
 Yury Gelman (born 1955), Ukrainian-born US Olympic fencing coach
 Sid Gillman, US, football player & coach
 Ronen "Nano" Ginzburg, Israel, coach for the Czech Republic national basketball team
 Alexander Gomelsky, Russia, head coach of USSR national team for 30 years, including victory in 1988 Summer Olympics, Naismith Basketball Hall of Fame, FIBA Hall of Fame
 Samuel Goodman, US, manager of gold-winning US Olympic rugby
 Eddie Gottlieb, Ukraine-born US, first basketball coach, manager, and owner of Philadelphia Warriors in the BAA/NBA, NBA founder
 Avram Grant, Israel, soccer manager, former head coach of English Premier Club Chelsea F.C. and of the Israel national football team
 Ofir Haim, Israel, soccer manager, head coach of the Israel national under-19 football team during their successful 2022 UEFA Euro Under-19 campaign (2nd place in the finals)
 Brad Greenberg, US, former men's basketball coach (Radford University)
 Seth Greenberg, US, firner men's basketball coach (Virginia Tech, South Florida, Long Beach State)
 Béla Guttmann, Hungary, football manager, AC Milan, São Paulo F.C., F.C. Porto, Benfica, C.A. Penarol
 Cecil Hart, Canada, hockey coach/manager (Montreal Canadiens); original Hart Trophy named after father David, & current one after him
 Paul Heyman, US, professional wrestling manager
 Melissa Hiatt, US, professional wrestling manager
 Nat Holman, US, basketball player & coach, Hall of Fame
 Red Holzman, US, basketball player & coach, Hall of Fame
 Jed Hoyer, US, baseball Executive VP and General Manager (Chicago Cubs); former General Manager, San Diego Padres
 Yoel Judah, US, boxer & trainer
 Cary Kaplan, Canada, President & General Manager, Brampton Beast hockey club; former Commissioner & Chairman of Canadian Soccer League
 Gabe Kapler, US, baseball outfielder, manager (Philadelphia Phillies and San Francisco Giants), 2021 NL Manager of the Year
 Béla Komjádi, Hungary, coach, International Swimming Hall of Fame
 Jerry Krause, US, former General Manager (Chicago Bulls)
 Manny Leibert, US, boxing manager & coach, Connecticut Boxing Hall of Fame
 Randy Levine, US, President of New York Yankees baseball team
 Tony Levine, US, football coach of University of Houston Cougars
 Lenny Levy, US, baseball coach (Pittsburgh Pirates)
 Marv Levy, US, football coach & General Manager (Montreal Alouettes, Buffalo Bills)
 Bob Melvin, US, baseball player and manager (Oakland A's), 3x Manager of the Year
 Cecil Moss, South Africa, coach of Springboks rugby team.
 Joe Pasternack,  US, men's basketball head coach (UC Santa Barbara)
 Josh Pastner, US, men's basketball head coach (Georgia Tech Yellow Jackets)
 Gabe Paul, US, baseball President & General Manager of Cleveland Indians and New York Yankees
 Bruce Pearl, US, men's basketball coach, Auburn University
 José Pekerman, Argentina, Argentine football manager
 David Pleat, England, football manager, Tottenham Hotspur, Luton Town
 Bela Rajki-Reich, Hungary, swimming and water polo coach
 Jimmie Reese, US, baseball second baseman, coach
 Ernie Roth, US, professional wrestling manager
 Larry Rothschild, US, baseball pitcher, coach, and manager (currently New York Yankees pitching coach)
 Yehoshua Rozin, Israeli basketball coach
 Dolph Schayes, US, basketball player & coach
 Mark Shapiro, US, General Manager of Cleveland Indians
 Allie Sherman, US, football player & coach, New York Giants
 Norm Sherry, US, baseball catcher, manager, and coach
 Matthew Silverman, US, President for Baseball Operations for Major League Baseball's Tampa Bay Rays
 Leonid Slutsky, Russia, National football team manager (2015–16) brought the Russian team to Euro-2016 in France, currently manages Hull City in English Championship League
 Marc Trestman, US, NFL head coach (Chicago Bears, 2013–14), current head coach of the Toronto Argonauts of the Canadian Football League
 Irina Viner-Usmanova, Russia, coach of multiple world and Olympic champions in rhythmic gymnastics, President of Russian Rhythmic Gymnastics Federation
 Dan Warthen, US, baseball pitcher and pitching coach (currently, for the Texas Rangers)
 Barak Bakhar, Israel, former player & current manager of the Israeli Premier League association football club Maccabi Haifa since 2020 (during their current 2022–23 UEFA Champions League and its prestigious Group stage)
 Yossi Benayoun, Israel, former player & current professional / technical manager of the Israel national football team since 2022
 Alon Hazan, Israel, former player & current head coach of the senior Israel national football team since 8 May 2022 (during their successful 2022–23 UEFA Nations League B campaign, where they were placed 1st, and thus has qualified to the upcoming 2024–25 UEFA Nations League A)

Officials 

 Menachem Ashkenazi, Bulgaria/Israel, association football, Olympic and World Cup referee
 Norm Drucker, US, former NBA referee and Supervisor of Officials
 Leo Goldstein, US, association football, World Cup assistant referee
 Jonathan Kaplan, South Africa, rugby union, world record for refereeing highest number of international rugby union test matches, most experienced Test referee of all time
 Wolf Karni, Finland, association football, Olympic referee
 Abraham Klein, Romania/Israel, association football, World Cup referee
 Jerry Markbreit, US, former NFL referee
 Mendy Rudolph, NBA and ABA referee, Naismith Basketball Hall of Fame
 Alon Yefet, Israel, association football, FIFA international referee
 Dr. Aviram D. Shmuely, Israel Wrestling Federation, United World Wrestling, 1S Category (Olympic) referee 2006–2021, participated as a referee for Israel at the 2020 Tokyo Summer Olympic Games

Owners

 Roman Abramovich, Russia/Israel, former owner of English Premier League association football club Chelsea Football Club
 Leslie Alexander, US, former owner of Houston Rockets; former owner of Houston Comets
 Micky Arison, Israel/US, owner of Miami Heat
 Larry Baer, US, CEO of the San Francisco Giants
 Steve Ballmer, US, owner of the Los Angeles Clippers
 Arthur Blank, US, owner of Atlanta Falcons, Atlanta United and Georgia Force
 Tony Bloom, England, owner of Brighton & Hove Albion F.C.
 Francis Borelli, France, former President of Paris Saint-Germain Football Club, AS Cannes
 Norman Braman, US, former owner of Philadelphia Eagles
 Alfréd Brüll, Hungary, chairman of sports club MTK
 Alan Cohen, US, owner of Florida Panthers hockey team
 Alan N. Cohen, US, former owner of New York Knicks and New York Rangers, co-owner of Boston Celtics and New Jersey Nets, and Chairman & CEO of Madison Square Garden Corporation
 Steve Cohen, US, owner of the New York Mets
 Uri Coronel, Dutch, former Chairman of Ajax Amsterdam
 Mark Cuban, US, owner of Dallas Mavericks
 William Davidson, US, Chairman of Palace Sports and Entertainment, principal owner of Detroit Pistons, Detroit Shock of the WNBA, and Tampa Bay Lightning of the NHL
 Al Davis, US, owner/coach of Oakland Raiders
 Barney Dreyfuss, US, owner of Pittsburgh Pirates, Baseball Hall of Fame
 Steve Ellman, US, owner of Phoenix Coyotes
 John J. Fisher, US, owner of the Oakland Athletics baseball team
 Andrew Freedman, US, former owner of New York Giants baseball team
 Emil Fuchs, German-born US, owner of Boston Braves baseball team
 Arcadi Gaydamak, Russia, owner of Beitar Jerusalem F.C.
 Alexandre Gaydamak, France & Russia, co-owner & Chairman of Portsmouth F.C.
 Dan Gilbert, US, owner of Cleveland Cavaliers
 Gary Gilbert, US, part owner of Cleveland Cavaliers, brother of Dan Gilbert
 Avram Glazer, US, joint chairman of Manchester United board
 Joel Glazer, US, joint chairman of Manchester United
 Malcolm Glazer, US, owner of Tampa Bay Buccaneers, majority owner of Manchester United
 Paul Godfrey, Canada, owner of the Toronto Blue Jays
 Chuck Greenberg, US, co-owner of Texas Rangers
 Ernie Grunfeld, US, basketball player & GM of Washington Wizards
 Peter Guber, US, co-owner of Golden State Warriors of the National Basketball Association (NBA), Los Angeles Dodgers of Major League Baseball, and Los Angeles FC of Major League Soccer
 Walter A. Haas Jr., US, owner of Oakland Athletics
 Joshua Harris, US, owner of New Jersey Devils and Philadelphia 76ers
 Ben Hatskin, Canada, founder and owner of the Winnipeg Jets
 Leon Hess, US, owner of New York Jets
 Jerold Hoffberger, US, owner of Baltimore Orioles baseball team
 Mat Ishbia, US, majority owner of Phoenix Suns
 Stan Kasten, US, former President of the Atlanta Braves and Washington Nationals and current president, and part-owner, of the Los Angeles Dodgers in baseball.
 Daryl Katz, Canada, owner of Edmonton Oilers
 Raanan Katz, Israel, part owner of Miami Heat & owner of Maccabi Tel Aviv
 Eugene Klein, US, owner of San Diego Chargers and part owner of Seattle SuperSonics
 Louis "Red" Klotz, US, NBA 5' 7" point guard, formed teams that play against and tour with the Harlem Globetrotters
 Herb Kohl, US, owner of Milwaukee Bucks (1985–2014)
 Bob Kraft, US, owner of New England Patriots & New England Revolution
 Joe Lacob, US, owner of Golden State Warriors
 Kurt Landauer, Germany, President of Bayern Munich
 Marc Lasry, Morocco, co-owner of the basketball's Milwaukee Bucks
 Al Lerner, US, owner of Cleveland Browns
 Randy Lerner, US, owner of Cleveland Browns & Aston Villa
 Ted Lerner and family, US, owners of Washington Nationals
 Daniel Levy, England, Chairman of Tottenham Hotspur
 Joe Lewis, England, owner Tottenham Hotspur F.C.
 Jeffrey Loria, US, former owner of Miami Marlins
 Bob Lurie, US, owner of San Francisco Giants
 Jeffrey Lurie, US, owner of Philadelphia Eagles
 Scott D. Malkin, US, co-owner of NY Islanders hockey team and 
 Jamie McCourt, US, President of Los Angeles Dodgers
 Art Modell, US, former owner of Baltimore Ravens
 Idan Ofer, Israel, co-owner of Spain's La Liga association football club Atlético Madrid, as well co-owner of Portugal's Primeira Liga association football club FC Famalicão.
 Abe Pollin, US, owner of Washington Wizards, former owner of NHL's Washington Capitals & WNBA's Washington Mystics
 Jaap van Praag, Dutch, President of Ajax Amsterdam 1964–78, President of Royal Dutch Football Association
 Michael van Praag, Dutch, President of Ajax Amsterdam, 1989–2002
 Bruce Ratner, US, minority owner of Brooklyn Nets
 Jerry Reinsdorf, US, owner of Chicago Bulls & Chicago White Sox
 Carroll Rosenbloom, US, owner of Baltimore Colts & Los Angeles Rams
 Chip Rosenbloom, US, owner of Los Angeles Rams
 Stephen M. Ross, US, owner of Miami Dolphins
 Henry Samueli, US, owner of Anaheim Ducks, founder of Broadcom Corporation
 Abe Saperstein, UK-born US, founder & owner of Harlem Globetrotters
 Irving Scholar, England, chairman Tottenham Hotspur F. C.
 Howard Schultz, US, owner of Seattle SuperSonics; founder of Starbucks
 Bud Selig, US, former Major League Baseball Commissioner, owner of Milwaukee Brewers
 Herbert Simon, US, owner of the Indiana Pacers basketball team
 Ed Snider, US, owner of Philadelphia Flyers and part-owner of  Philadelphia Eagles
 Daniel Snyder, US, owner of Washington Redskins
 Donald Sterling, US, former owner of the Los Angeles Clippers
 Stuart Sternberg, US, owner of Tampa Bay Rays
 Alan Sugar, England, Chairman of Tottenham Hotspur
 Larry Tanenbaum, Canada, owner of Toronto Maple Leafs & Toronto Raptors
 Preston Robert Tisch, US, from 1991 until his death in 2005 Tisch owned 50% of New York Giants American football team
 Steve Tisch, US, part-owner of the New York Giants, son of Preston Tisch
 Leonard Tose, US, owner of Philadelphia Eagles
 Cliff Viner, US, co-owner of Florida Panthers
 Jeffrey Vinik, US, owner of Tampa Bay Lightning (NHL) and minority owner of Boston Red Sox (MLB)
 Zygi Wilf, German-born US, principal owner of Minnesota Vikings
 Fred Wilpon, US, minority owner of New York Mets
 Jeff Wilpon, US, minority owner and COO of New York Mets
 Max Winter, US, owner of Minneapolis Lakers and former owner of Minnesota Vikings
 Lewis Wolff, US, owner of Oakland Athletics
 Brett Yormark, US, President & CEO of Brooklyn Nets and Barclays Center
 Alexander Knaster, USSR/UK, owner of Italian soccer club A.C. Pisa 1909l
 Steve Belkin, US, former co-owner of the Atlanta Thrashers and Atlanta Hawks
 Alona Barkat, Israel, owner of Israeli Premier League association football club Hapoel Be'er Sheva.

Promoters

 Bob Arum, US, boxing promoter
 Senda Berenson, Russian-born US, basketball pioneer
 Mickey Duff, British boxing promoter
 Al Farb (1905–2005), US, boxing promoter of championship bouts including Floyd Patterson vs. Brian London 
 Joel Gertner, US, professional wrestling promoter 
 Paul Heyman, US, professional wrestling manager & promoter
 Mike Jacobs, US, boxing promoter
 Sam Muchnick, US, wrestling promoter
 J Russell Peltz, US, boxing promoter

Sportscasters

 Kenny Albert, US, sportscaster
 Marv Albert, US, sportscaster
 Mel Allen, US, sportscaster, New York Yankees play-by-play announcer
 Chris Berman, US, ESPN talk show host
 Len Berman, US, sportscaster
 Bonnie Bernstein, US, ESPN sportscaster
 Steve Bornstein, US, President & CEO of NFL Network
 Steve Buckhantz, US, Washington Wizards play-by-play announcer 
 Steve Bunin, US, ESPN sportscaster
 Craig Carton, US, WFAN morning show
 Gary Cohen,US, New York Mets telecaster
 Linda Cohn, US, ESPN anchor
 Myron Cope, US, Pittsburgh Steelers radio announcer
 Howard Cosell, US, sportscaster
 Seth Davis, US, ESPN sportscaster
 Ian Eagle, US, sportscaster
 Rich Eisen, US, ESPN, NFL network anchor
 Josh Elliott, US, television journalist
 Howard Finkel, US, WWE Hall of Fame announcer.
 Roy Firestone, US, sportscaster
 CK Friedlander, South Africa, rugby commentator
 Elliotte Friedman, Canada, CBC Sports broadcaster
 Jack van Gelder, Dutch sports commentator
 Hank Goldberg, US, football analyst
 Marty Glickman, US, sprinter & broadcaster; US Olympic team, All American (football)
 Doug Gottlieb, US, ESPN NCAA basketball analyst
 Mike Greenberg, US, ESPN anchor
 Billy Jaffe, US, New York Islanders sportscaster
 Max Kellerman, boxing broadcaster
 Suzy Kolber, US, ESPN sportswriter
 Tony Kornheiser, US, radio show host, tv show host, author
 Andrea Kremer, US, sportscaster/ NBC sideline reporter
 Justin Kutcher, US, sportscaster
 Michael Landsberg, Canada, TSN anchor
 Ken Levine, Major League Baseball announcer
 Steve Levy, US, ESPN anchor
 Mitch Melnick, Canada, Montreal Expos English radio colour analyst
 Al Michaels, US, sportscaster
 Johnny Most, US, Boston Celtics sportscaster
 Elliott Price, Canada, Montreal Expos radio play-by-play
 Karl Ravech, US, ESPN journalist
 Jim Rome, US, radio, TV host
 Howie Rose, US, New York Islanders, New York Mets sportscaster 
 Sam Rosen, US, New York Rangers on TV, NHL on OLN, NFL on Fox sportscaster
 Dick Schaap, US, sportswriter & broadcaster
 Jeremy Schaap, US, sports commentator & broadcaster (son of Dick Schaap)
 Adam Schefter, US, sportswriter and tv analyst
 Louis O. Schwartz, US, President, American Sportscasters Association (ASA); Founder, ASA Hall of Fame; Editor, ASA Insiders Sportsletter; former President, Finger Lakes Broadcasting Corp.
 Archie Shacksnovis, first man to broadcast rugby in South Africa
 Dan Shulman, Canada, sportscaster ESPN: Sunday Baseball, College Basketball coverage
 Charley Steiner, US, Los Angeles Dodgers radio-TV play-by-play announcer
 Dick Stockton, US, TNT broadcaster
 Steve Stone, US, WGN-TV broadcaster
 Bert Sugar, US, boxing writer
 Suzyn Waldman, US, New York Yankees TV play-by-play announcer & current commentator/analyst for NY Yankees radio; first woman to hold either position on regular basis for Major League Baseball team
 Lisa Winston
 Warner Wolf, US, sportscaster, w/CBS 9 in Washington, D.C. & CBS 2 in New York City, now w/WABC NewsTalkRadio 77 in NYC

See also
 List of Jewish American sportspeople
 List of Jewish chess players
 List of Jews in sports
 Jewish Sports Review
 International Jewish Sports Hall of Fame, Netanya, Israel
 US National Jewish Sports Hall of Fame and Museum, Commack, New York

References

Books

 Jews and Baseball: The Post-Greenberg Years, 1949–2008, Burton Alan Boxerman, Benita W. Boxerman, McFarland, 2010, 
 The Baseball Talmud: The Definitive Position-by-Position Ranking of Baseball's Chosen Players, Howard Megdal, Collins, 2009, 
 Jews and the Sporting Life, Vol. 23 of Studies in Contemporary Jewry, Ezra Mendelsohn, Oxford University Press US, 2009, 
 Day by Day in Jewish Sports History, Bob Wechsler, KTAV Publishing House, 2008, 
 The Big Book of Jewish Athletes: Two Centuries of Jews in Sports – a Visual History, Peter S. Horvitz, Joachim Horvitz, S P I Books, 2007, 
 The Big Book of Jewish Sports Heroes: An Illustrated Compendium of Sports History and The 150 Greatest Jewish Sports Stars, Peter S. Horvitz, SP Books, 2007, 
 Jews, Sports, and the Rites of Citizenship, Jack Kugelmass, University of Illinois Press, 2007, 
 The New Big Book of Jewish Baseball: An Illustrated Encyclopedia & Anecdotal History, Peter S. Horvitz, Joachim Horvitz, Perseus Distribution Services, 2007, 
 Emancipation through Muscles: Jews and Sports in Europe, Michael Brenner, Gideon Reuveni, translated by Brenner, Reuveni, U of Nebraska Press, 2006, 
 Judaism's Encounter with American Sports, Jeffrey S. Gurock, Indiana University Press, 2005, 
 Great Jews in Sports, Robert Slater, Jonathan David Publishers, 2004, 
 Jews and the Olympic Games: The Clash between Sport and Politics: with a complete review of Jewish Olympic medallists, Paul Taylor, Sussex Academic Press, 2004, 
 The Big Book of Jewish Baseball: An Illustrated Encyclopedia & Anecdotal History, Peter S. Horvitz, Joachim Horvitz, SP Books, 2001, 
 Jewish Sports Legends: the International Jewish Hall of Fame, 3rd Ed, Joseph Siegman, Brassey's, 2000, 
 Sports and the American Jew, Steven A. Riess, Syracuse University Press, 1998, 
 [https://archive.org/details/trent_0116405589635 When Boxing was a Jewish Sport], Allen Bodner, Praeger, 1997, 
 Ellis Island to Ebbets Field: Sport and the American Jewish Experience, Peter Levine, Oxford University Press US, 1993, 
 The Jewish Child's Book of Sports Heroes, Robert Slater, Jonathan David Publishers, 1993, 
 The International Jewish Sports Hall of Fame, Joseph M. Siegman, SP Books, 1992, 
 The Jewish Athletes Hall of Fame, B. P. Robert Stephen Silverman, Shapolsky Publishers, 1989, 
 The Jewish Boxers Hall of Fame, Ken Blady, SP Books, 1988, 
 The Jewish Baseball Hall of Fame: a Who's Who of Baseball Stars, Erwin Lynn, Shapolsky Publishers, 1986, 
 From the Ghetto to the Games: Jewish Athletes in Hungary, Andrew Handler, East European Monographs, 1985, 
 The Jew in American Sports, Harold Uriel Ribalow, Meir Z. Ribalow, Edition 4, Hippocrene Books, 1985, 
 Jewish Baseball Stars, Harold Uriel Ribalow, Meir Z. Ribalow, Hippocrene Books, 1984, 
 The Jewish Athlete: A Nostalgic View, Leible Hershfield, s.n., 1980
 Encyclopedia of Jews in Sports, Bernard Postal, Jesse Silver, Roy Silver, Bloch Pub. Co., 1965

External links

 International Jewish Sports Hall of Fame (Netanya, Israel)
 Jewish Canadian Athletes Hall of Fame
 US National Jewish Sports Hall of Fame and Museum  (US)
 Michigan Jewish Sports Hall of Fame
 Jewish Sports Hall of Fame of Western Pennsylvania
 Jewish Sports Hall of Fame of Northern California
 Southern California Jewish Sports Hall of Fame
 Orange County Jewish Sports Hall of Fame  (California)
 Philadelphia Jewish Sports Hall of Fame (Pennsylvania)
 Rochester Jewish Sports Hall of Fame  (NY)

Sport,non-players
 
Jews,non-players